The Lucky Stars is a 2005 Chinese fantasy/costume comedy-drama TV series on Fu Lu Shou, 3 Chinese mythology deities or stars. It was directed by Liu Zhi and produced by Li Mi and Beijing-based NMG Pictures.

The show stars Malaysian actor Christopher Lee, Taiwanese actor Chang Shih and Hong Kong actor Bobby Au-yeung in the lead roles, while Singaporean actress Fann Wong and mainland China actors Xu Zheng, Kou Zhenhai and Ning Jing round out the main cast. It was first broadcast on Singapore's MediaCorp Channel 8 on December 6, 2005. In China it was first broadcast on Guangzhou Television on January 9, 2006.

Cast
Christopher Lee as Fu Star (God of Fortune)
Chang Shih as Lu Star (God of Prosperity)
Bobby Au-yeung as Shou Star (God of Longevity)
Fann Wong as Magu
Xu Zheng as Zhang Guolao
Kou Zhenhai as Jade Emperor
Ning Jing as Wangmu Niangniang

References
The Lucky Stars on MediaCorp

External links

Shenmo television series
2005 Chinese television series debuts
2006 Chinese television series endings
Mandarin-language television shows